Down Town / Yasashisa ni Tsutsumareta Nara is Maaya Sakamoto's nineteenth single. "Down Town" is used as an opening theme for the anime series And Yet The Town Moves (Soredemo Machi wa Mawatteiru) while "Yasashisa ni Tsutsumareta Nara" is the opening theme for the OVA Tamayura. The original version of this song was released in 1974 by Yumi Arai, who was also its composer and lyricist, and was used as the ending song for Kiki's Delivery Service (Majo no Takkyūbin). It is Sakamoto's first single to come in CD+DVD and CD only editions.

All three tracks from this single are covers of 1970s' hit songs. "Down Town" is originally sung by Japanese musical group Sugar Babe, "Yasashisa ni Tsutsumareta Nara" is a Yumi Arai cover while "Kanashikute Yarikirenai" was first performed by The Folk Crusaders.

Track listing

Charts

References

External links
flyingDOG profile 

2010 singles
2010 songs
Maaya Sakamoto songs
Victor Entertainment singles
Anime songs